Teenui–Mapumai is a Cook Islands electoral division returning one member to the Cook Islands Parliament.

The electorate was created in 1981, when the Constitution Amendment (No. 9) Act 1980 adjusted electorate boundaries and split the multi-member electorate of Atiu into two separate constituencies.

Members of Parliament for Teenui–Mapumai
Unless otherwise stated, all MPs terms began and ended at general elections.

Election results

2014 election

2010 election

2006 election

2004 election

References

Atiu
Cook Islands electorates